Chloeia is a genus of marine polychaete worms.

Members of this genus are morphologically characterized by an elliptical body composed of certain number of segments, depending on the species, with external gills situated on both lateral sides of the back, each segment has a pair of them. Their number and repartition also depends on the species.
Lateral sides of the body are cover with fin, sharp and venomous whitish calcareous bristles or setae.
Adults of this genus are often colorful especially on the dorsum.

The locomotion is done by parapodia, every segment possesses a pair in bilateral position, from which are activated "paddles", one dorsally called notopodia and another one ventrally called neuropodia.

Chloeia's distribution is circumtropical. Most of the known species are found in the Indian and Pacific Ocean so only few species lives in the Atlantic Ocean.

List of species
There are 28 species in the genus Chloeia:
 Chloeia amphora Horst, 1910
 Chloeia australis Kudenov, 1993
 Chloeia bengalensis Kinberg, 1867
 Chloeia bistriata Grube, 1868
 Chloeia candida Kinberg, 1857
 Chloeia conspicua Horst, 1910
 Chloeia egena Grube, 1855
 Chloeia entypa Chamberlin, 1919
 Chloeia flava (Pallas, 1766)
 Chloeia furcigera Quatrefages, 1866
 Chloeia fusca McIntosh, 1885
 Chloeia inermis Quatrefages, 1866
 Chloeia kudenovi Barroso & Paiva, 2011
 Chloeia macleayi Haswell, 1878
 Chloeia maculata Potts, 1909
 Chloeia malaica Kinberg, 1867
 Chloeia nuda Quatrefages, 1866
 Chloeia parva Baird, 1868
 Chloeia pinnata Moore, 1911
 Chloeia pseudeuglochis Augener, 1922
 Chloeia quatrefagesii Baird, 1868
 Chloeia rosea Potts, 1909
 Chloeia rupestris Risso, 1826
 Chloeia tumida Baird, 1868
 Chloeia venusta Quatrefages, 1866
 Chloeia violacea Horst, 1910
 Chloeia viridis Schmarda, 1861
 Chloeia bimaculata

References

External links

Polychaete genera
Errantia